Christophe Justel (1580–1649) was a French scholar, known as Christophorus or Christopher Justellus.

A librarian, canonist and Protestant, he served as secretary to the French king Henri IV, buying the office for his son Henri Justel (1620–1693).

Works
 Nomocanon Photii Patriarchae Constantinopolitani cum commentariis Theodori Balsamonis Patriarchae Antiocheni (1614, 1625)
 Codex canonum ecclesiae universae. A Justiniano Imperatore confirmatus (1610–18) later in the 1661 edition by G. Voellus (with Henri Justel) known as Bibliotheca juris canonici veteris
 Histoire de la maison de Turenne (1645)

External links
 Paper by Stephen Massil (PDF)

1580 births
1649 deaths
17th-century French lawyers
Canon law jurists
Huguenots
French librarians
17th-century French writers